Samaria Saraí Gómez Mejía (born 18 February 2002) is a Salvadoran footballer who plays as a forward for Elpides Karditsas and the El Salvador women's national team.

Early life
Gómez grew up in the San Martín municipality of San Salvador. As a child, she played in youth tournaments in San Bartolo and Ilopango, often as the only girl on her team.

Club career

AD Legends
In 2017, the 15-year-old Gómez began playing for AD Legends' under-17 team, ultimately winning five consecutive championships with the side.

Real Estelí F.C.
In 2019, the 17-year-old Gómez moved to Nicaragua to sign with Real Estelí. In 2021, she won back-to-back Nicaraguan women's football championships with the club.

Le Havre AC
In October 2021, the 19-year-old Gómez signed with French team Le Havre AC. She made her debut in a first-round Coupe de France victory over Valenciennes FC.

Gómez scored for the first time or the club in the subsequent second-round match against OCNA, netting Le Havre's third goal in a 4–1 win. On the final day of the season, Gómez was a 67th-minute substitute in a 4–0 win over FC Vendenheim that secured Le Havre's promotion to Division 1 Féminine.

Elpides Karditsas
In September 2022, Gómez signed a one-year deal with Greek team Elpides Karditsas. She made her Greek A Division debut on 20th November 2022, scoring a hat-trick in a 0–6 victory away to Avantes Chalkida.

International career
On April 8th 2022, Gómez earned her first senior cap for El Salvador, coming on as a half-time substitute in a 2–0 win over Barbados.

References

2002 births
Living people
Salvadoran women's footballers
Salvadoran expatriate footballers
Women's association football forwards
Salvadoran expatriate sportspeople in Nicaragua